The lozenge in heraldry is a diamond-shaped rhombus charge (an object that can be placed on the field of the shield), usually somewhat narrower than it is tall. It is to be distinguished in modern heraldry from the fusil, which is like the lozenge but narrower, though the distinction has not always been as fine and is not always observed even today. A mascle is a voided lozenge—that is, a lozenge with a lozenge-shaped hole in the middle—and the rarer rustre is a lozenge containing a circular hole in the centre. A field covered in a pattern of lozenges is described as lozengy; similar fields of mascles are masculy, and fusils, fusily (see Variation of the field). In civic heraldry, a lozenge sable is often used in coal-mining communities to represent a lump of coal.

A lozenge shaped escutcheon is used to depict heraldry for a female (in continental Europe especially an unmarried woman), but is also sometimes used as a shape for mural monuments in churches which commemorate females. Funerary hatchments are generally shown within lozenge shaped frames, for both male and female deceased.

Types
 Lozenge: a diamond-shaped rhombus, usually somewhat narrower than it is tall
 Fusil: a thin lozenge; very much taller than it is wide.
 Mascle: a voided lozenge (i.e. with a largish lozenge shaped hole)
 Rustre (very rare): a lozenge pierced (i.e. with a smallish round hole)

Lozengy
The blason Lozengy is a form of variation of the field or of another charge (for example a chevron lozengy) which consists of lozenges semée, or sown like seeds (Latin: , a seed), or strewn across the field, but in an organised contiguous pattern.  The arms granted to the Canadian John Francis Cappucci bring an example of lozengy voided, the same as "lozengy" but with a smaller lozenge-shaped hole cut out of each segment.

Examples

See also 
 Weckeler, an historical coin named after its depiction of a heraldic lozenge or lozenged shield

References

Further reading
Fox-Davies, Arthur Charles (1909). A Complete Guide to Heraldry. New York: Dodge Pub. Co.(and the more recent editions) 
Canadian Heraldic Authority, Public Register, with many official versions of modern coats of arms, searchable online archive.gg.ca
South African Bureau of Heraldry,  data on registered heraldic representations (part of National Archives of South Africa); searchable online (but no illustration), national.archsrch.gov.za
Civic Heraldry of England and Wales, fully searchable with illustrations, civicheraldry.co.uk
Heraldry Society of Scotland, members' arms, fully searchable with illustrations of bearings, heraldry-scotland.com
Heraldry Society (England), members' arms, with illustrations of bearings, only accessible by armiger's name (though a Google site search would provide full searchability), theheraldrysociety.com
Royal Heraldry Society of Canada, Members' Roll of Arms, with illustrations of bearings, only accessible by armiger's name (though a Google site search would provide full searchability), heralrdry.ca
Brooke-Little, J P, Norroy and Ulster King of Arms, An heraldic alphabet (new and revised edition), Robson Books, London, 1985 (first edition 1975); very few illustrations
Greaves, Kevin, A Canadian Heraldic Primer, Heraldry Society of Canada, Ottawa, 2000, illustrations
Moncreiffe of Easter Moncreiffe, Iain, Kintyre Pursuivant of Arms, and Pottinger, Don, Herald Painter Extraordinary to the Court of the Lord Lyon King of Arms Simple Heraldry, Thomas Nelson and Sons, London andf Edinburgh, 1953; illustrated
Friar, Stephen (ed) A New Dictionary of Heraldry  Alphabooks, Sherborne, 1987; with very few illustration of attitudes

Heraldic charges